The Troubles in Derrylin recounts incidents during, and the effects of, The Troubles in Derrylin, County Fermanagh, Northern Ireland.

1972
 21 September—Thomas Bullock and his wife, Emily, were shot and killed at their home at Killynick, near Derrylin.
 16 December—Louis Leonard, a Provisional Irish Republican Army volunteer from Donagh, found dead in Derrylin.

1974
 10 April—George Saunderson, shot at his workplace.
 21 April—James Murphy, shot in nearby Corraveigh.
 2 December—John Maddocks, killed on foot patrol near Derrylin.

1985 
 1 February—James Graham was shot while driving a school bus.

1988 
 6 April 1988—William Burleigh was killed near Derrylin.

References

External links
NI Conflict Archive on the Internet

Derrylin